Eastman Credit Union (ECU) is a credit union headquartered in Kingsport, Tennessee, that is insured by the National Credit Union Administration. It was founded in 1934, originally to serve employees of the Tennessee Eastman Chemical Company.

In 2005, it expanded to a community charter, opening membership to the wider community.

The current CEO is Kelly Price.

ECU has over 290,000 members and over $7.5 billion in assets. It is the largest credit union in the state of Tennessee by asset size.

Membership is open to residents in the following counties:

In Virginia: Lee, Scott, Wise, Washington, Dickenson, and Russell.

In Tennessee: Sevier, Grainger, Hamblen, Jefferson, Cocke, Greene, Unicoi, Carter, Washington, Hawkins, Hancock, and Sullivan.

In Texas: Gregg and Harrison.

Additionally, membership is open to employees of companies that have partnered with ECU and their immediate families. The largest of these companies are Eastman Chemical Company and Food City.

References

External links
Official Website

Credit unions based in Tennessee
Banks established in 1934
1934 establishments in Tennessee
Kingsport, Tennessee